Adam "Nealo" Neal (born 21 May 1990) is a former English professional rugby league footballer who last played for Oldham (Heritage № 1338) in Betfred League 1.

Background
Neal was born in Irlam, near Salford, England.

Career
He previously played for the Warrington Wolves and Salford City Reds in the Super League and Sheffield Eagles in the Kingstone Press Championship. 
He made his début for Warrington Wolves in the Challenge Cup victory against Leigh Centurions on 20 April 2008.

Coaching
After retiring in 2018 it was reported that he had joined the Oldham RLFC backroom strength and conditioning staff

References

External links
Oldham profile
Profile at warringtonwolves.com

1990 births
Living people
English rugby league players
Oldham R.L.F.C. players
People from Irlam
Rugby league players from Salford
Rugby league props
Salford Red Devils players
Sheffield Eagles players
Warrington Wolves players